Uraz Januzaquly Isayev (May 28, 1899 – August 29, 1938) was a Kazakh Soviet politician. He was prime minister of the Kazakh Autonomous Soviet Socialist Republic (May 1929 - December 1936) and the Kazakh Soviet Socialist Republic (December 1936 - September 1937). He was a candidate member of the Central Committee elected by the 17th Congress of the All-Union Communist Party (Bolsheviks) from 1934 to October 12, 1937 and a full member until May 31, 1938. He was arrested and executed during the Great Purge. He was rehabilitated on May 19, 1956.

References

Sources
 "Эпоха, представленная в лицах" | Блог библиотеки им. Гоголя
 Архив Александра Н. Яковлева - Альманах "Россия. ХХ век" - Биографический словарь
 Travelsouls - Блог о жизни в путешествии
 ТАКОГО СОВНАРКОМА У НАС БОЛЬШЕ НЕ БУДЕТ
 Бейбут КОЙШИБАЕВ: «Мерило интеллигентности – твой поступок» (1-бөлім) | Abai.kz ақпараттық порталы. Абай. Алашорда. Кітапхана. Жаңалықтар. Мақалалар. Саясат. Мәдениет
  

1899 births
1938 deaths
Great Purge victims from Kazakhstan
People executed by the Soviet Union
Soviet rehabilitations
Heads of government of the Kazakh Soviet Socialist Republic